Muhammad ibn Abdallah ibn Muhriz was a ninth century governor of the Yemen for the Abbasid Caliphate.

A mawla of the caliph al-Ma'mun (r. 813–833), Muhammad was appointed governor in ca. 823. Upon his arrival in the province he remained in the chief town of Sana'a, while sending his son to act as his deputy in al-Janad. Shortly afterwards, however, the inhabitants of al-Janad revolted against his son, and Muhammad decided that his position was too weak to maintain. He therefore set out for the Hijaz and left the Yemen in the hands of the local chief Abbad ibn al-Ghamr al-Shihabi, who remained in control until the arrival of the next governor Ishaq ibn al-Abbas ibn Muhammad al-Hashimi.

Notes

References 
 
 
 

Abbasid governors of Yemen
9th-century Arabs
9th-century people from the Abbasid Caliphate